Alexandar Soundarrajan is a Tamil actor, TV anchor and businessman. He debuted in the Tamil film Vengayam as the protagonist.

Early life 
Alexandar Soundarrajan grew up in a household with a strong legal orientation, which prompted him to pursue a degree in law at Dr. Ambedkar Global Law Institute, where he received a BA, L.L.B.

Career 
Soundarrajan began his career as an anchor in 2006 at Makkal TV. He appeared in television series prior to 2013.

While he was working with Makkal TV in 2011, he made his debut in a film, Vengayam, in 2012. Sankagiri Rajkumar directed the film, in which Alexandar played the protagonist opposite Sathyaraj. Cheran served as the producer.

He is also a board member of Food Corporation of India, Ministry of Consumer Affairs, Food and Public Distribution.

Alexandar Soundarrajan assisted his father Dr. M. Soundarrajan to establish the family business. His father is the chairman of Hijau Group of Companies who swindled crores of money and got arrested. He is the Managing Director of NRI Legal services (Needhi Foundation), Hijau Associates Pvt Ltd, Hijau Agro LLP and Glube India.

Television
Manmanam (2008– 2011)
Chinna Chinna Aasai (2010–2013)
Vedikkai vilayattu (2007– 2014)
Sandhai (2011–2013) 
Uzhavar Sandhai                          
Sattam Solvathu enna (2011–2013)
Nodikku Nodi Athiradi (2012–2013)

Awards
Best TV show Anchor from (Loyola College) in 2010

References

1985 births
Living people
Indian actors
Tamil actors